Somalia is a country located in the Horn of Africa. It has maintained a healthy informal economy, based mainly on livestock, remittance/money transfer companies and telecommunications. Due to a dearth of formal government statistics and the recent civil war, it is difficult to gauge the size or growth of the economy. For 1994, the CIA estimated the GDP at $3.3 billion. In 2001, it was estimated to be $4.1 billion. By 2009, the CIA estimated that the GDP had grown to $5.731 billion, with a projected real growth rate of 2.6%. According to a 2007 British Chambers of Commerce report, the private sector also grew, particularly in the service sector. Unlike the pre-civil war period when most services and the industrial sector were government-run, there has been substantial, albeit unmeasured, private investment in commercial activities; this has been largely financed by the Somali diaspora, and includes trade and marketing, money transfer services, transportation, communications, fishery equipment, airlines, telecommunications, education, health, construction and hotels. Libertarian economist Peter Leeson attributes this increased economic activity to the Somali customary law (referred to as Xeer), which he suggests provides a stable environment to conduct business in.

Notable firms 
This list includes notable companies with primary headquarters located in the country. The industry and sector follow the Industry Classification Benchmark taxonomy. Organizations which have ceased operations are included and noted as defunct.

See also

References 

 
Somalia